Ahmar Subtownship is a subtownship of Pyapon Township in Pyapon District, Ayeyarwady Region, Myanmar. The namesake of the subtownship is Ahmar, a small town of 3,859 people. The subtownship is coastal, bordering the Andaman Sea to its south, east and west. To its north, it borders Bogale Township and the other parts of Pyapon Township. It is located near the Meinmahla Kyun Wildlife Sanctuary.

The township has a labour shortage and rising labour costs due to stresses from out-migration. Low income, lack of healthcare and lack of educational opportunities push rural residents in the subtownship towards Pyapon or Hlaingthaya, Yangon's industrial suburb. The lack of off-season crops makes the already low agricultural income seasonal income, prompting many young adults to move to urban areas as they become jobless after the harvesting season. Most people within this rural community are poor, earning only about one US dollar a day from agriculture, nipa palm harvesting or fishing.

References

Subtownships of Ayeyarwady Region